ADS 9731 is a star system that consists of six stars, located in the constellation of Corona Borealis. Four of the stars are visually separate in the sky, forming a visual star system, which was resolved using adaptive optics in 1995. Two of these stars were themselves found to be spectroscopic binaries in 1998, resulting in a total of six known stars in the system. It is one of very few multiple star systems known to have at least six members.

Hierarchy of orbits
The components are organised thus: Aa and Ab are yellow-white main sequence stars of spectral types F4V and F5V and 1.35 and 1.32 solar masses respectively, which orbit each other every 3.27 days. This pair is in a 450-year orbit with star B, a star of spectral type G4V that has around the same mass as the Sun. Star C is a yellow white star of spectral type F3V around 1.41 times as massive as the sun, which has just started brightening and moving off the main sequence. It is in a 1000-year orbit with a pair of stars, Da and Db, a yellow-white main sequence star of spectral type F7V and a red dwarf of spectral type M3V. Da and Db take 14.28-days to orbit each other. Finally the system of stars C and Dab, and the system of stars Aab and B, take over 20,000 years to orbit each other.

The combined light from the whole system results in an integrated V magnitude of 6.9.  Published apparent magnitudes for the components vary greatly and some are certainly in error, but components A, B, C, and D are approximately of visual magnitude 8, 10, 9, and 9 respectively.  Models of all six components show that Aa and Ab have magnitudes 8.5 and 8.7 respectively while the faint secondary to component D is about 16th magnitude.  The CD pair is slightly brighter than the AB pair, although component A is slightly brighter than component C.

The star system has been considered as a possible target for direct imaging searches for exoplanets, but no planets have yet been detected in the system.

References

F-type main-sequence stars
G-type main-sequence stars
M-type main-sequence stars
6
Corona Borealis
Durchmusterung objects
139691
076563